Charles M. Leibson (June 30, 1929 – December 10, 1995) was a justice of the Kentucky Supreme Court from 1983 until his resignation in 1995.

Leibson was "born into a family of lawyers", and was the valedictorian of his class at the University of Louisville School of Law. He practiced in his father's firm until 1976, when he was elected to the Circuit Court of Jefferson County, Kentucky. In 1982, he won election as a Republican to the state supreme court. He wrote a noted opinion in Commonwealth v. Wasson, striking down as unconstitutional Kentucky's law against homosexual sodomy.

Leibson resigned from the court due to lymphoma in October 1995, and died at his home in Louisville that December, at the age of 66.

References

Justices of the Kentucky Supreme Court
1929 births
1995 deaths
People from Louisville, Kentucky
University of Louisville School of Law alumni
Kentucky Republicans